Elwin Bay is an Arctic waterway in Qikiqtaaluk Region, Nunavut, Canada. It is located Prince Regent Inlet by the northeastern shore of Somerset Island. Port Leopold is nearby.

History
In 1852, in search of the lost Franklin expedition, the French Arctic explorer Lieutenant Joseph René Bellot spent time in the bay and its surrounds.

It is filled with the skeletons and bones of several hundred beluga left by whalers. Many hunters died on whaling expeditions.

References

Bays of Qikiqtaaluk Region